Nicholas Bronson Albery (28 July 1948 – 3 June 2001) was a British social inventor and author, was the instigator or coordinator of a variety of projects aimed at an improvement to society, often known as the alternative society.

Early life and education
Albery was born at Bricket House, St Albans, Hertfordshire, son of the theatre impresario Sir Donald Albery (son of Sir Bronson Albery, also a theatre impresario) and his second wife, Cicely, daughter of Army officer Reginald Harvey Henderson Boys.

While a student at St John's College, Oxford, Albery became involved with psychedelic and spiritual movements in San Francisco and dropped out of college. After a period in Haight Ashbury he returned to the UK and joined the anti-university in London.

Life

BIT
He became involved with the newly started BIT Information Service, quickly becoming a driving force in the development of wider activities for BIT so that it became one of the first social centres. Around 1972/73, at the peak of its activities and with the momentum given by Nicholas, BIT Info-Service ran 24 hours a day, with "BIT-workers" coming up at around 10 PM to take the night shift until around 8:00 AM the following day.

The "Windsor Festival case"
In 1974, in the aftermath of a violent attack by police on the Windsor Free Festival, Albery, playwright Heathcote Williams and his partner Diana Senior successfully sued David Holdsworth, the Thames Valley Chief Constable, for creating a riotous situation in which the police attacked the plaintiffs.

Frestonia
Albery was a Minister for the Free State of Frestonia in North Kensington and a Green Party candidate in Notting Hill.

Social innovations' activist
In 1985, out of BIT Information Service, he founded the Institute for Social Inventions. From small beginnings (a network of inventors, a quarterly newsletter), the Institute grew into a full-fledged organisation under his leadership: producing an annual compendium, running social inventions workshops and promoting creative solutions around the world. The Institute included Edward de Bono, Anita Roddick and Fay Weldon among its patrons.

The Global Ideas Bank, which he founded in 1995 as an offspring of the Institute for Social Inventions, was first established online, and new features were added: online submission, voting systems, categorisation, a message board, and so on.

Promoting "natural" death
Albery and his wife, the psychotherapist Josefine Speyer, became interested in ecological approaches to death and funerals, and in breaking the taboos that surround death in western societies. In 1991, with Christianne Heal, they founded the Natural Death Centre, offering advice on DIY burials. The much-patronised centre provides midwives for the dying, death exercises, recyclable coffins, etc.

Saturday Walkers' Club
Albery founded the self-organising Saturday Walkers' Club in the mid-1990s.

Personal life
His brother is stage director Tim Albery.

Death
Albery died in a car accident, on 3 June 2001.

References

Further reading
 Beam, Alan (1976) "Rehearsal for the year 2000: (drugs, religions, madness, crime, communes, love, visions, festivals and lunar energy) : the rebirth of Albion Free State (known in the Dark Ages as England) : memoirs of a male midwife (1966-1976)" - an account of the early years of BIT with most names changed to protect the innocent.

External links
 The Global Ideas Bank
 Nicholas Albery Foundation
 The Natural Death Centre
 Nicholas Albery page, Radical Consultation
 The Saturday Walkers' Club

1948 births
2001 deaths
People from St Albans
Alumni of St John's College, Oxford
20th-century squatters